Mind the Drift is the third studio album by American heavy metal band Big Business.

Track listing
 "Found Art" - 3:34
 "Gold and Final" - 3:32
 "Cats, Mice." - 3:52
 "I Got It Online" - 3:59
 "The Drift" - 3:40
 "Ayes Have It" - 4:17
 "Cold Lunch" - 3:33
 "Theme From Big Business II" - 8:43
 "Cold Lunch (Demo)" (Bonus Track) - 3:40
 "The Drift (Demo)" (Bonus Track) - 3:48
 "Send Me A Postcard" (Bonus Track) - 2:45

Personnel 
Big Business
 Jared Warren - bass, lead vocals
 Coady Willis - drums
 Toshi Kasai - guitar, backing vocals, keyboards

Technical personnel
 Phil Elk and Big Business – recording
 Cameron Nicklaus - second engineer
 Sadaharu Yagi - second engineer
 JJ Golden - mastering
 James O'Mara - layout and execution

References

2009 albums
Hydra Head Records albums
Big Business (band) albums